Bangor Celtic F.C. were an Irish association football club based in from Crumlin, Dublin. They played in the Leinster Senior League Senior Division before merging with Greenhills/Greenpark in 2019.

History 
Bangor Celtic were founded in 1987. They were founded as a breakaway club from Cashel Villa. They originally located themselves at the playing field of Good Shepherd School in Rathfarnham shortly after the breakaway.  They first entered the FAI Cup in 1999. In the 20th century, the club later moved to Iveagh Grounds in Crumlin, South Dublin. Bangor Celtic have been used as a feeder club to the League of Ireland Premier Division side Bohemians. They won their first Leinster Senior League Senior Division league title in 2005 and then won it again in 2009.

Merge 
In 2019, Bangor Celtic merged with nearby Greenhills/Greenpark F.C.. The club decided that they would not locate themselves at the Iveagh Grounds and instead moved to Greenhills/Greenpark's ground due to superior facilities. The Greenhills Boys section of the club was kept separate from the merger. The newly merged club would be renamed Bangor Greenhills/Greenpark F.C. and would continue to play in the Leinster Senior League. The merger was made as part of a trend of smaller Dublin football clubs merging to concentrate talent and be able to challenge larger junior clubs like Crumlin United and Cherry Orchard. It also allowed the clubs to share sponsorship with Bangor Celtic's agreement with Permanent TSB being transferred over to the new club.

Honours
Leinster Senior League: 2
2004–05, 2008–09

References

Association football clubs in Dublin (city)

Crumlin, Dublin
Leinster Senior League (association football) clubs